The Kineshma constituency (No.92) is a Russian legislative constituency in Ivanovo Oblast. Until 2007 the constituency covered most of Ivanovo Oblast east of Ivanovo, however, since 2016 the constituency covers northern half of Ivanovo and northern Ivanovo Oblast.

Members elected

Election results

1993

|-
! colspan=2 style="background-color:#E9E9E9;text-align:left;vertical-align:top;" |Candidate
! style="background-color:#E9E9E9;text-align:left;vertical-align:top;" |Party
! style="background-color:#E9E9E9;text-align:right;" |Votes
! style="background-color:#E9E9E9;text-align:right;" |%
|-
|style="background-color:#EA3C38"|
|align=left|Sergey Zenkin
|align=left|Civic Union
|
|30.19%
|-
|style="background-color:"|
|align=left|Nadezhda Zotina
|align=left|Independent
|
|19.69%
|-
|style="background-color:#E9E26E"|
|align=left|Valery Lyutarevich
|align=left|Russian Democratic Reform Movement
|
|9.49%
|-
|style="background-color:#019CDC"|
|align=left|Dmitry Belov
|align=left|Party of Russian Unity and Accord
|
|8.64%
|-
|style="background-color:"|
|align=left|Aleksandr Lyubovskikh
|align=left|Liberal Democratic Party
|
|6.80%
|-
|style="background-color:"|
|align=left|Nikolay Spanovsky
|align=left|Independent
|
|4.21%
|-
|style="background-color:#000000"|
|colspan=2 |against all
|
|12.97%
|-
| colspan="5" style="background-color:#E9E9E9;"|
|- style="font-weight:bold"
| colspan="3" style="text-align:left;" | Total
| 
| 100%
|-
| colspan="5" style="background-color:#E9E9E9;"|
|- style="font-weight:bold"
| colspan="4" |Source:
|
|}

1995

|-
! colspan=2 style="background-color:#E9E9E9;text-align:left;vertical-align:top;" |Candidate
! style="background-color:#E9E9E9;text-align:left;vertical-align:top;" |Party
! style="background-color:#E9E9E9;text-align:right;" |Votes
! style="background-color:#E9E9E9;text-align:right;" |%
|-
|style="background-color:"|
|align=left|Vladimir Tikhonov
|align=left|Communist Party
|
|23.95%
|-
|style="background-color:"|
|align=left|Igor Yushkevich
|align=left|Independent
|
|15.00%
|-
|style="background-color:"|
|align=left|Vasily Boyko
|align=left|Independent
|
|12.53%
|-
|style="background-color:#DA2021"|
|align=left|Sergey Zenkin (incumbent)
|align=left|Ivan Rybkin Bloc
|
|9.03%
|-
|style="background-color:"|
|align=left|Sergey Budnitsky
|align=left|Liberal Democratic Party
|
|7.57%
|-
|style="background-color:"|
|align=left|Aleksandr Sokolov
|align=left|Independent
|
|7.34%
|-
|style="background-color:"|
|align=left|Valentina Gubernatorova
|align=left|Kedr
|
|4.22%
|-
|style="background-color:"|
|align=left|Yelena Shuvalova
|align=left|Power to the People
|
|3.92%
|-
|style="background-color:"|
|align=left|Igor Gladkov
|align=left|Independent
|
|2.19%
|-
|style="background-color:"|
|align=left|Boris Chernyakov
|align=left|Yabloko
|
|1.87%
|-
|style="background-color:#3A46CE"|
|align=left|Rudolf Martynov
|align=left|Democratic Choice of Russia – United Democrats
|
|1.48%
|-
|style="background-color:#5A5A58"|
|align=left|Vladimir Manyakin
|align=left|Federal Democratic Movement
|
|1.47%
|-
|style="background-color:"|
|align=left|Albert Shamgulov
|align=left|Independent
|
|0.62%
|-
|style="background-color:#000000"|
|colspan=2 |against all
|
|6.65%
|-
| colspan="5" style="background-color:#E9E9E9;"|
|- style="font-weight:bold"
| colspan="3" style="text-align:left;" | Total
| 
| 100%
|-
| colspan="5" style="background-color:#E9E9E9;"|
|- style="font-weight:bold"
| colspan="4" |Source:
|
|}

1999

|-
! colspan=2 style="background-color:#E9E9E9;text-align:left;vertical-align:top;" |Candidate
! style="background-color:#E9E9E9;text-align:left;vertical-align:top;" |Party
! style="background-color:#E9E9E9;text-align:right;" |Votes
! style="background-color:#E9E9E9;text-align:right;" |%
|-
|style="background-color:"|
|align=left|Vladimir Tikhonov (incumbent)
|align=left|Communist Party
|
|39.41%
|-
|style="background-color:#3B9EDF"|
|align=left|Marina Anferova
|align=left|Fatherland – All Russia
|
|16.88%
|-
|style="background-color:"|
|align=left|Viktor Yelizarov
|align=left|Independent
|
|13.79%
|-
|style="background-color:"|
|align=left|Igor Cheremushkin
|align=left|Liberal Democratic Party
|
|6.07%
|-
|style="background-color:"|
|align=left|Sergey Reznik
|align=left|Independent
|
|5.95%
|-
|style="background-color:"|
|align=left|Valery Agalakov
|align=left|Our Home – Russia
|
|4.53%
|-
|style="background-color:#000000"|
|colspan=2 |against all
|
|11.49%
|-
| colspan="5" style="background-color:#E9E9E9;"|
|- style="font-weight:bold"
| colspan="3" style="text-align:left;" | Total
| 
| 100%
|-
| colspan="5" style="background-color:#E9E9E9;"|
|- style="font-weight:bold"
| colspan="4" |Source:
|
|}

2001

|-
! colspan=2 style="background-color:#E9E9E9;text-align:left;vertical-align:top;" |Candidate
! style="background-color:#E9E9E9;text-align:left;vertical-align:top;" |Party
! style="background-color:#E9E9E9;text-align:right;" |Votes
! style="background-color:#E9E9E9;text-align:right;" |%
|-
|style="background-color:"|
|align=left|Valentina Krutova
|align=left|Independent
|
|55.91%
|-
|style="background-color:"|
|align=left|Viktor Yelizarov
|align=left|Independent
|
|28.13%
|-
|style="background-color:"|
|align=left|Sergey Grigoryev
|align=left|Independent
|
|5.25%
|-
|style="background-color:"|
|align=left|Vasily Kopytov
|align=left|Independent
|
|1.91%
|-
|style="background-color:#000000"|
|colspan=2 |against all
|
|6.82%
|-
| colspan="5" style="background-color:#E9E9E9;"|
|- style="font-weight:bold"
| colspan="3" style="text-align:left;" | Total
| 
| 100%
|-
| colspan="5" style="background-color:#E9E9E9;"|
|- style="font-weight:bold"
| colspan="4" |Source:
|
|}

2003

|-
! colspan=2 style="background-color:#E9E9E9;text-align:left;vertical-align:top;" |Candidate
! style="background-color:#E9E9E9;text-align:left;vertical-align:top;" |Party
! style="background-color:#E9E9E9;text-align:right;" |Votes
! style="background-color:#E9E9E9;text-align:right;" |%
|-
|style="background-color:"|
|align=left|Mikhail Babich
|align=left|United Russia
|
|40.47%
|-
|style="background-color:#00A1FF"|
|align=left|Aleksandr Maslov
|align=left|Party of Russia's Rebirth-Russian Party of Life
|
|22.57%
|-
|style="background-color:"|
|align=left|Alyona Shevyakova
|align=left|Liberal Democratic Party
|
|10.39%
|-
|style="background:"| 
|align=left|Valery Nevolin
|align=left|Yabloko
|
|5.41%
|-
|style="background-color:#000000"|
|colspan=2 |against all
|
|18.09%
|-
| colspan="5" style="background-color:#E9E9E9;"|
|- style="font-weight:bold"
| colspan="3" style="text-align:left;" | Total
| 
| 100%
|-
| colspan="5" style="background-color:#E9E9E9;"|
|- style="font-weight:bold"
| colspan="4" |Source:
|
|}

2016

|-
! colspan=2 style="background-color:#E9E9E9;text-align:left;vertical-align:top;" |Candidate
! style="background-color:#E9E9E9;text-align:leftt;vertical-align:top;" |Party
! style="background-color:#E9E9E9;text-align:right;" |Votes
! style="background-color:#E9E9E9;text-align:right;" |%
|-
| style="background-color: " |
|align=left|Yury Smirnov
|align=left|United Russia
|
|36.83%
|-
|style="background-color:"|
|align=left|Vladimir Klenov
|align=left|Communist Party
|
|24.89%
|-
|style="background-color:"|
|align=left|Maksim Veryasov
|align=left|Liberal Democratic Party
|
|14.28%
|-
|style="background-color:"|
|align=left|Dmitry Sivokhin
|align=left|A Just Russia
|
|7.98%
|-
|style="background:"| 
|align=left|Viktor Kuzmenko
|align=left|Communists of Russia
|
|4.18%
|-
|style="background-color:"|
|align=left|Andrey Valkov
|align=left|Patriots of Russia
|
|3.82%
|-
|style="background-color:"|
|align=left|Ivan Melnikov
|align=left|Yabloko
|
|3.78%
|-
|style="background-color:"|
|align=left|Yury Ganenko
|align=left|Civic Platform
|
|1.00%
|-
| colspan="5" style="background-color:#E9E9E9;"|
|- style="font-weight:bold"
| colspan="3" style="text-align:left;" | Total
| 
| 100%
|-
| colspan="5" style="background-color:#E9E9E9;"|
|- style="font-weight:bold"
| colspan="4" |Source:
|
|}

2021

|-
! colspan=2 style="background-color:#E9E9E9;text-align:left;vertical-align:top;" |Candidate
! style="background-color:#E9E9E9;text-align:left;vertical-align:top;" |Party
! style="background-color:#E9E9E9;text-align:right;" |Votes
! style="background-color:#E9E9E9;text-align:right;" |%
|-
|style="background-color: " |
|align=left|Mikhail Kizeyev
|align=left|United Russia
|
|34.64%
|-
|style="background:"| 
|align=left|Stanislav Nizovskikh
|align=left|Communists of Russia
|
|11.45%
|-
|style="background-color:"|
|align=left|Pavel Popov
|align=left|A Just Russia — For Truth
|
|8.77%
|-
|style="background-color: "|
|align=left|Nikolay Yershov
|align=left|Party of Pensioners
|
|7.70%
|-
|style="background-color:"|
|align=left|Sergey Rimsky
|align=left|Yabloko
|
|7.27%
|-
|style="background-color:"|
|align=left|Aleksey Pereletov
|align=left|Liberal Democratic Party
|
|7.09%
|-
|style="background-color: "|
|align=left|Mikhail Mikhaylov
|align=left|New People
|
|6.92%
|-
|style="background-color:"|
|align=left|Denis Komarovsky
|align=left|Rodina
|
|6.19%
|-
|style="background-color:"|
|align=left|Oleg Lebedev
|align=left|The Greens
|
|2.55%
|-
| colspan="5" style="background-color:#E9E9E9;"|
|- style="font-weight:bold"
| colspan="3" style="text-align:left;" | Total
| 
| 100%
|-
| colspan="5" style="background-color:#E9E9E9;"|
|- style="font-weight:bold"
| colspan="4" |Source:
|
|}

Notes

References

Russian legislative constituencies
Politics of Ivanovo Oblast